History of the Church may refer to:

 History of Christianity
 History of the Catholic Church
 History of The Church of Jesus Christ of Latter-day Saints
 Church History (Eusebius)
 History of the Church (book)
 History of the Australian band, The Church